The Malawian ambassador in Beijing is the official representative of the Government in Lilongwe to the Government of the People's Republic of China.

List of representatives

Malawi–Taiwan relations

References 

 
China
Malawi